Megachile revicta is a species of bee in the family Megachilidae. It was described by Theodore Dru Alison Cockerell in 1913.

References

Revicta
Insects described in 1913